The Bhopal - Pratapgarh Express is a weekly superfast train which runs between Bhopal Junction railway station of Bhopal, the capital city of Madhya Pradesh and Lucknow, the capital city of Uttar Pradesh and then to a neighbouring town called Pratapgarh.

Arrival and departure
Train no.12183 departs from Bhopal Junction every Sundays, Mondays, Tuesdays, Thursdays and Fridays at 19:15 hrs., reaching Pratapgarh at 07:30 hrs. the next day.
Train no.12184 departs from Pratapgarh every Mondays, Tuesdays, Wednesdays, Thursdays and Saturdays at 23:00 hrs., reaching Bhopal Junction the next day at 08:55 hrs.

Route and halts
The train goes via Bina - Jhansi - Kanpur rail route. The important halts of the train are:
 BHOPAL JUNCTION
 Vidisha
 Bina Junction
 Lalitpur
 Jhansi Junction
 Orai
 Kanpur Central
 LUCKNOW
 Rae Bareli Junction
 Amethi
 Pratapgarh

Coach composite
The train normally consist a total of 21 Coaches which are :
 1 AC II TIER
 2 AC III TIER
 13 SLEEPER COACHES
 4 GENERAL COACH
 1 PARSEL VAN

The train do not have any pantry car.

Average speed and frequency
The train goes with an average speed of 68 km/hour weekly from both the sites.

Other trains from Bhopal to Lucknow

 12183/12184 - Bhopal - Lucknow Express (weekly)

References
 

Transport in Bhopal
Express trains in India
Rail transport in Madhya Pradesh
Rail transport in Uttar Pradesh
Transport in Pratapgarh, Uttar Pradesh